is a Japanese singer, model, YouTuber and actress who is a former member of the Japanese idol girl group Nogizaka46.

Career 
After graduating from high school, Shiraishi attended music college as she desired to be a singer. Later on, one of her teachers persuaded her to audition for Nogizaka46.

Shiraishi's singing career started when she was accepted as one of the first generation members of AKB48's official rival group, Nogizaka46, on 21 August 2011. She was chosen as one of the members performing on the group's debut single "Guruguru Curtain" on 22 February 2012. When Nogizaka46 released their second single "Oide Shampoo", she was once again chosen to perform. Her career as a model started when she participated in Girls Award 2012 Autumn/Winter alongside former Nogizaka46 bandmate Nanase Nishino.

Shiraishi achieved further popularity when she appeared on the 1 January 2013 episode of Count Down TV and the 16 March 2013 episode of Uma Zuki!. Shiraishi has been a permanent presenter on the latter since the 5 January 2013 episode and Bachi Bachi Elekiteru since the 16 April 2013 episode.

She became the youngest model for women's fashion magazine Ray, issued by Shufonotomo, since 23 March 2013.

Shiraishi was chosen as the center position in Nogizaka46 for their sixth single "Girl's Rule", released on 3 July 2013. She took over the center position from Rina Ikoma.

On 17 December 2014, Shiraishi held an event for her first photo book, Seijun na Otona Shiraishi Mai. Shiraishi is the first Nogizaka46 member to publish a solo photo book. "I'm happy to be the first one," she said. Her second photobook, Mai Style, was published on January 23, 2015. It ranked fourth on the Oricon general book ranking and first in the photobook category selling 19,000 copies in the first week.

In September 2016, Shiraishi played a supporting role in the film Ushijima the Loan Shark 3.

On 7 February 2017, her third solo photo book, Passport, was published. It was reprinted twenty times, and the total printing volume exceeded 310,000 copies until June 2018. Moreover, in the first half of the year 2018, she made the highest number of appearances in television commercials among any other tarento in Japan.

Shiraishi was in charge of the center position for Nogizaka46's twentieth single "Synchronicity" which was released on 25 April 2018. It sold 1,116,852 copies in the first week.

On 9 January 2020, Shiraishi announced that she would graduate from Nogizaka46 after the release of their 25th single, "Shiawase no Hogoshoku", with a farewell performance during the group's Tokyo Dome concert scheduled in May. On 28 April, she announced that this has been postponed due to the COVID-19 pandemic. On 20 August, the performance date was rescheduled for 28 October and was a livestreamed event.

In August, Shiraishi launched her YouTube channel, called "My Channel" (stylized in all lowercase and a homophone of her given name). As of August 2021, it has reached 1.35 million subscribers.

Discography

Singles with Nogizaka46

Albums with Nogizaka46

Other featured songs

Filmography

Television

Films

Commercials

Bibliography

Magazines
 Larme, Tokuma Shoten 2012-, as an exclusive model since 2012
 Ray, Shufunotomo 1988-, as an exclusive model since 2013

Photobooks
 Kikan Nogizaka vol.2 Shoka (Tokyo News Service, 12 June 2014), 
 Seijun na Otona Shiraishi Mai (Gentosha, 10 December 2014), 
 Mai Style (Shufunotomo, 23 January 2015), 
 Passport (Kodansha, 7 February 2017),

References

External links
  
 

Living people
People from Gunma Prefecture
Japanese female idols
Japanese female models
Japanese women singers
Japanese women pop singers
21st-century Japanese actresses
1992 births
Nogizaka46 members
Japanese YouTubers
Models from Gunma Prefecture